Glenn H. James (April 19, 1890 – February 1, 1962) was a member of the Wisconsin State Assembly.

Biography
James was born on April 19, 1890 in Montfort, Wisconsin. James was a farmer. He served on the Montfort town board and was chairman. James also served on the school board as a clerk. He graduated from high school in 1906. James died of a stroke on February 1, 1962 in a Dodgeville, Wisconsin hospital.

Career
James was a member of the Assembly twice: first from 1939 to 1942, and again from 1945 to 1946. In addition, he was Chairman of Eden, Iowa County, Wisconsin. He was a Republican.

References

People from Montfort, Wisconsin
Mayors of places in Wisconsin
Wisconsin city council members
School board members in Wisconsin
Republican Party members of the Wisconsin State Assembly
1890 births
1962 deaths
20th-century American politicians
People from Iowa County, Wisconsin